Croxdale railway station served the village of Croxdale, County Durham, England from 1872 to 1938 on the East Coast Main Line.

History 
The station was opened in May 1872 by the North Eastern Railway. It closed on 26 September 1938 to both passengers and goods traffic.

References

External links 

Disused railway stations in County Durham
Former North Eastern Railway (UK) stations
Railway stations in Great Britain opened in 1872
Railway stations in Great Britain closed in 1938
1872 establishments in England
1938 disestablishments in England